Jorge Salomão (5 July 1937 – 25 May 2015) was a Brazilian boxer. He competed in the men's light welterweight event at the 1960 Summer Olympics.

References

1937 births
2015 deaths
Brazilian male boxers
Olympic boxers of Brazil
Boxers at the 1960 Summer Olympics
Boxers at the 1959 Pan American Games
Pan American Games competitors for Brazil
Sportspeople from São Paulo
Light-welterweight boxers